Events in the year 1917 in Belgium.

Incumbents
Monarch: Albert I
Prime Minister: Charles de Broqueville

Events
 1 May – Emilius Seghers consecrated as bishop of Ghent
 7–14 June – Battle of Messines (1917)
31 July – 10 November – Battle of Passchendaele (also called Third Battle of Ypres)
31 July – 2 August – Battle of Pilckem Ridge
 16–18 August – Battle of Langemarck (1917)
 20–26 September – Battle of the Menin Road Ridge
26 September – 3 October – Battle of Polygon Wood
4 October – Battle of Broodseinde
9 October – Battle of Poelcappelle
12 October – First Battle of Passchendaele
26 October – 10 November – Second Battle of Passchendaele

Publications
 Émile Cammaerts, Through the Iron Bars (Two Years of German Occupation in Belgium), with illustrations by Louis Raemaekers (London and New York, John Lane).
 Hugh Gibson, A Diplomatic Diary (London, New York and Toronto, Hodder and Stoughton, 1917).
 Arnold J. Toynbee, The Belgian Deportations (London, T. Fisher Unwin)
 Leon van der Essen, The Invasion & the War in Belgium from Liège to the Yser, with a sketch of the diplomatic negotiations preceding the conflict (London, T.F. Unwin).

Births
 30 January – Jan Verroken, politician (died 2020)
 1 April – Michel Donnet, military pilot (died 2013)
 16 May – Raymond Laurent, herpetologist (died 2005)
 15 June – Jean Alexandre, cyclist
 28 June – Albert de Cleyn, footballer (died 1990)
 25 July – Charles Brahm, Olympic canoeist (died 2003)
 7 August – Catherine Stevens, athlete
 23 August – André Waterkeyn, engineer (died 2005)
 2 October – Christian de Duve, biochemist (died 2013)
 22 October – Eugene Deckers, actor (died 1977)

Deaths
 5 January – Félix Wielemans (born 1863), Army Chief of Staff
 30 January – Mutien-Marie Wiaux (born 1841), saint
 2 March – Jules Van Dievoet (born 1844), lawyer
 6 March – Jules Vandenpeereboom (born 1843), politician
 25–26 March – Van Raemdonck Brothers, soldiers
 13 May – Jules Schmalzigaug (born 1882/3), painter
 28 May – Raoul Warocqué (born 1870), industrialist
 7 June – Willie Redmond (born 1861), Irish nationalist
 29 June – Frans Schollaert (born 1851), politician
 4 July – Frank Shanley (born 1889), English footballer
 12 July – Donald Cunnell (born 1893), British flying ace
 31 July – Hedd Wyn (born 1887), poet
 10 August – James Brannick (born 1889), footballer
 11 August – Harold Ackroyd (born 1877), physician
 16 August – Willie Doyle (born 1873), Irish Jesuit
 21 August – Nellie Spindler (born 1891), nurse
 5 September – Arthur Verhaegen (born 1847), architect and politician
 19 September – Émile de Borchgrave (born 1837), historian and diplomat
 21 September – Frederick Birks (born 1894), Australian soldier
 28 September
 Patrick Bugden (born 1897), Australian soldier 
 Kurt Wissemann (born 1893), German flying ace
 9 November – Paul Wittouck (born 1851), industrialist

References

 
1910s in Belgium